Western United Football Club (A-League Women) is an Australian professional women's soccer club based in the western Melbourne suburb of Truganina. The club was formed through a successful bid to enter the A-League Women, commencing in the 2022–23 season.

History
On 12 May 2022, it was announced that Western United had joined the A-League Women from the 2022–23 season. Mark Torcaso was appointed as the inaugural head coach on 29 June 2022. A month later, Helen Winterburn was appointed as the assistant coach. In August, Hannah Keane became the team's first international signing. In October 2022, the club confirmed the football department staff. In November 2022, the club held their first friendly, defeating defending champions Melbourne Victory with Keane scoring the only goal of the match.

Players

Managers

See also
 Women's soccer in Australia
 List of women's association football clubs
 Western United FC

References

External links
 Official website

Western United FC (A-League Women)
Women's soccer clubs in Australia
Association football clubs established in 2022
2022 establishments in Australia
A-League Women teams
Sport in the City of Melton